The Ionic order is one of the three canonic orders of classical architecture, the other two being the Doric and the Corinthian. There are two lesser orders: the Tuscan (a plainer Doric), and the rich variant of Corinthian called the composite order. Of the three classical canonic orders, the Corinthian order has the narrowest columns, followed by the Ionic order, with the Doric order having the widest columns.

The Ionic capital is characterized by the use of volutes. The Ionic columns normally stand on a base which separates the shaft of the column from the stylobate or platform while the cap is usually enriched with egg-and-dart.

The ancient architect and architectural historian Vitruvius associates the Ionic with feminine proportions (the Doric representing the masculine).

Description

Capital

The major features of the Ionic order are the volutes of its capital, which have been the subject of much theoretical and practical discourse, based on a brief and obscure passage in Vitruvius. The only tools required to design these features were a straight-edge, a right angle, string (to establish half-lengths) and a compass. Below the volutes, the Ionic column may have a wide collar or banding separating the capital from the fluted shaft (as in, for example, the neoclassical mansion Castle Coole), or a swag of fruit and flowers may swing from the clefts or "neck" formed by the volutes.

Originally, the volutes lay in a single plane (illustration at right); then it was seen that they could be angled out on the corners. This feature of the Ionic order made it more pliant and satisfactory than the Doric to critical eyes in the 4th century BC: angling the volutes on the corner columns ensured that they "read" equally when seen from either front or side facade. However, some classical artists viewed this as unsatisfactory, feeling that the placement of Ionic columns at building corners required a distortion at the expense of the capital's structural logic; the Corinthian order would solve this by reading equally well from all angles. The 16th-century Renaissance architect and theorist Vincenzo Scamozzi designed a version of such a perfectly four-sided Ionic capital that it became standard; when a Greek Ionic order was eventually reintroduced in the later 18th century Greek Revival, it conveyed an air of archaic freshness and primitive, perhaps even republican, vitality.

Columns and entablature
The Ionic column is always more slender than the Doric; therefore, it always has a base: Ionic columns are eight and nine column-diameters tall, and even more in the Antebellum colonnades of late American Greek Revival plantation houses.

Ionic columns are most often fluted. After a little early experimentation, the number of hollow flutes in the shaft settled at 24. This standardization kept the fluting in a familiar proportion to the diameter of the column at any scale, even when the height of the column was exaggerated. Roman fluting leaves a little of the column surface between each hollow; Greek fluting runs out to a knife edge that was easily scarred.

In some instances, the fluting has been omitted. English architect Inigo Jones introduced a note of sobriety with plain Ionic columns on his Banqueting House, Whitehall, London, and when Beaux-Arts architect John Russell Pope wanted to convey the manly stamina combined with intellect of Theodore Roosevelt, he left colossal Ionic columns unfluted on the Roosevelt memorial at the American Museum of Natural History, New York City, for an unusual impression of strength and stature. Wabash Railroad architect R.E. Mohr included eight unfluted Ionic frontal columns on his 1928 design for the railroad's St. Louis suburban stop Delmar Station.

The entablature resting on the columns has three parts: a plain architrave divided into two, or more generally three, bands, with a frieze resting on it that may be richly sculptural, and a cornice built up with dentils (like the closely spaced ends of joists), with a corona ("crown") and cyma ("ogee") molding to support the projecting roof. Pictorial often narrative bas-relief frieze carving provides a characteristic feature of the Ionic order, in the area where the Doric order is articulated with triglyphs. Roman and Renaissance practice condensed the height of the entablature by reducing the proportions of the architrave, which made the frieze more prominent.

Anta capital

The Ionic anta capital is the Ionic version of the anta capital, the crowning portion of an anta, which is the front edge of a supporting wall in Greek temple architecture. The anta is generally crowned by a stone block designed to spread the load from superstructure (entablature) it supports, called an "anta capital" when it is structural, or sometimes "pilaster capital" if it is only decorative as often during the Roman period.

In order not to protrude unduly from the wall, these anta capitals usually display a rather flat surface, so that the capital has more or less a rectangular-shaped structure overall. The Ionic anta capital, in contrast to the regular column capitals, is highly decorated and generally includes bands of alternating lotuses and flame palmettes, and bands of eggs and darts and beads and reels patterns, in order to maintain continuity with the decorative frieze lining the top of the walls. This difference with the column capitals disappeared with Roman times when anta or pilaster capitals have designs very similar to those of the column capitals. The Ionic anta capitals as can be seen in the Ionic order temple of the Erechtheion (circa 410 BCE), are characteristically rectangular Ionic anta capitals, with extensive bands of floral patterns in prolongation of adjoining friezes.

History of use

The Ionic order originated in the mid-6th century BC in Ionia (broadly equivalent to modern day İzmir Province), as well as the southwestern coastland and islands of Asia Minor settled by Ionians, where Ionic Greek was spoken. The Ionic order column was being practiced in mainland Greece in the 5th century BC. It was most popular in the Archaic Period (750–480 BC) in Ionia. The first of the great Ionic temples was the Temple of Hera on Samos, built about 570–560 BC by the architect Rhoikos. It stood for only a decade before it was leveled by an earthquake. A longer-lasting 6th century Ionic temple was the Temple of Artemis at Ephesus, one of the Seven Wonders of the Ancient World. The Parthenon, although it conforms mainly to the Doric order, also has some Ionic elements. A more purely Ionic mode to be seen on the Athenian Acropolis is exemplified in the Erechtheum.

Following the conquests of Alexander the Great in the east, a few examples of the Ionic order can be found as far as Pakistan with the Jandial temple near Taxila. Several examples of capitals displaying Ionic influences can be seen as far away as Patna, India, especially with the Pataliputra capital, dated to the 3rd century BC, and seemingly derived from the design of the Ionic anta capital, or the Sarnath capital, which has been described as "Perso-Ionic", or "quasi-Ionic".

Vitruvius, a practicing architect who worked in the time of Augustus, reports that the Doric column had its initial basis in the proportions of the male body, while Ionic columns took on a "slenderness" inspired by the female body. Though he does not name his source for such a self-conscious and "literary" approach, it must be in traditions passed on from Hellenistic architects, such as Hermogenes of Priene, the architect of a famed temple of Artemis at Magnesia on the Meander in Lydia (now Turkey).

Renaissance architectural theorists took his hints to interpret the Ionic order as matronly in comparison to the Doric order, though not as wholly feminine as the Corinthian order. The Ionic is a natural order for post-Renaissance libraries and courts of justice, learned and civilized. Because no treatises on classical architecture survive earlier than that of Vitruvius, identification of such "meaning" in architectural elements as it was understood in the 5th and 4th centuries BC remains tenuous, though during the Renaissance it became part of the conventional "speech" of classicism.

From the 17th century onwards, a much admired and copied version of Ionic was that which could be seen in the Temple of Fortuna Virilis in Rome, first clearly presented in a detailed engraving in Antoine Desgodetz, Les edifices antiques de Rome (Paris 1682).

Gallery

See also
 Ancient Greek architecture
 Aeolic order

References

External links

Ionic order exemplified in architecture of Buffalo, New York
Ionic order, after Vitruvius Archived from the original on August 26, 2005
"Understanding buildings" website: Ionic order
Denis Andrey and Mirko Galli, "Geometric methods of the 1500s for laying out the ionic volute"
Early Development and Formal Definition of the Ionic Capital
Classical orders and elements

Ancient Greek architecture
Orders of columns